This is a compilation of initialisms and acronyms commonly used in astronomy. Most are drawn from professional astronomy, and are used quite frequently in scientific publications. A few are frequently used by the general public or by amateur astronomers.

The acronyms listed below were placed into one or more of these categories:
 Astrophysics terminology – physics-related acronyms
 Catalog – collections of tabulated scientific data
 Communications network – any network that functions primarily to communicate with spacecraft rather than performing astronomy
 Data – astrophysical data not associated with any single catalog or observing program
 Celestial object – acronyms for natural objects in space and for adjectives applied to objects in space
 Instrumentation – telescope and other spacecraft equipment, particularly detectors such as imagers and spectrometers
 Meeting – meetings that are not named after organizations
 Observing program – astronomical programs, often surveys, performed by one or more individuals; may include the groups that perform surveys
 Organization – any large private organization, government organization, or company
 Person – individual people
 Publication – magazines, scientific journals, and similar astronomy-related publications
 Software – software excluding catalogued data (which is categorized as  "catalog") and scientific images
 Spacecraft – any spacecraft except space telescopes
 Telescope – ground-based and space telescopes; organizations that operate telescopes (for example, the National Optical Astronomy Observatory (NOAO)) are listed under "organization"

0–9 
 1RXH – (catalog) 1st ROSAT X-ray HRI, a catalog of sources detected by ROSAT in pointed observations with its High Resolution Imager
 1RXS – (catalog) 1ROSAT X-ray Survey, a catalog of sources detected by ROSAT in an all-sky survey
 2dF – (instrumentation) Two-degree field, spectrograph on the Anglo-Australian Telescope
 2dFGRS – (observing program) Two-degree-Field Galaxy Redshift Survey
 2D-FRUTTI – (instrumentation) Two dimensional photon counting system
 2MASP – (catalog) Two-micron all sky survey prototype, an early version of the 2MASS catalog
 2MASS – (observing program/catalog) Two-Micron All Sky Survey, an all-sky survey in the near-infrared; also, the catalog of sources from the survey
 2MASSI – (catalog) Two-Micron All Sky Survey, Incremental release, one of the versions of the 2MASS catalog
 2MASSW – (catalog) Two-Micron All Sky Survey, Working database, one of the versions of the 2MASS catalog
 2SLAQ – (observing program) 2dF-SDSS LRG and QSO survey
 6dF – (instrumentation) six-degree field, spectrograph on the UKST

A 
 A&A – (publication) Astronomy & Astrophysics, a European scientific journal
 AAA – (organization) Amateur Astronomers Association of New York
 AAO – (organization) Australian Astronomical Observatory (prior to 1 July 2010: Anglo-Australian Observatory)
 AAS – (organization) American Astronomical Society
 AAT – (telescope) Anglo-Australian Telescope
 AMBER – (telescope) a near-infrared interferometric instrument at VLTI
 AAVSO – (organization) American Association of Variable Star Observers
 ABBA – ADC Backend For Bolometer Array
 ABRIXAS – (observing program) A BRoadband Imaging X-ray All-sky Survey
 AC – (catalog) Catalogue Astrographique
 ACE – (spacecraft) Advanced Composition Explorer
 ACIS – (instrumentation) Advanced CCD Imaging Spectrometer, an instrument on the Chandra X-Ray Observatory
 ACM – (meeting) Asteroids, Comets, and Meteors
 ACP – (instrumentation) – Aerosol Collector and Pyrolyser, an instrument on the Huygens probe
 ACS – (instrumentation) Advanced Camera for Surveys, an instrument on the Hubble Space Telescope
 ACV – (celestial object) Alpha Canes Venatici, a class of rotating variable stars with strong magnetic fields named after Alpha Canum Venaticorum (Cor Caroli), the archetype for the class
 ACYG – (celestial object) Alpha CYGni, a class of rotating variable stars named after Alpha Cygni (Deneb), the archetype for the class
 ADAF – (astrophysics terminology) Advection Dominated Accretion Flow, a mechanism by which matter is slowly accreted onto a black hole
 ADC – (organization) Astronomical Data Center
 ADEC – (organization) Astrophysics Data Centers Executive Council, an organization that provides oversight for the Astrophysics Data and Information Services
 ADF – (organization) Astrophysics Data Facility
 ADS – (catalog) Aitken Double Stars
 ADS – (catalog) The Smithsonian Astrophysical Observatory/NASA astrophysics data system, an on-line database of almost all astronomical publications
 ADIS – (organization) Astrophysics Data and Information Services
 ADS – (organization) Astrophysics Data Service, an organization that maintains an online database of scientific articles
 AEGIS – (observing program) the All-wavelength Extended Groth strip International Survey
 AFGL – (organization) Air Force Geophysics Laboratory, a research laboratory now part of the United States Air Force Research Laboratory
 AFOEV – (organization) Association française des observateurs d'étoiles variables
 AG – (organization) Astronomische Gesellschaft
 AGAPE – (observing program) Andromeda Galaxy and Amplified Pixels Experiment, a search for microlenses in front of the Andromeda Galaxy
 AGB – (celestial object) asymptotic giant branch, a type of red giant star
 AGC – (catalog) Arecibo general catalog
 AGK – (catalog) Astronomische Gesellschaft Katalog
 AGN – (celestial object) Active galactic nucleus
 AGU – (organization) American Geophysical Union
 AIM – (spacecraft) Aeronomy of Ice in the Mesosphere, a spacecraft that will study the Noctilucent clouds
 AIPS – (software) Astronomical Image Processing System
 AJ – (publication) Astronomical Journal
 ALaMO – (organization) Automated Lunar and Meteor Observatory
 ALEXIS – (instrumentation) Array of Low Energy X-ray Imaging Sensors
 ALMA – (telescope) Atacama Large Millimeter/Sub-millimeter Array
 ALPO – (organization) Association of Lunar and Planetary Observers
 AMANDA – (telescope) Antarctic Muon And Neutrino Detector Array, a neutrino telescope
 AMASE – (software) Astrophysics Multi-spectral Archive Search Engine
 AMS – (organization) American Meteor Society
 AN – (publication) Astronomische Nachrichten, a German scientific journal
 ANS – (telescope) Astronomical Netherlands Satellite
 ANS – (organization) Astro News Service
 ANSI – (organization) American National Standards Institute
 AO – (instrumentation) Adaptive optics
 AOR – (instrumentation) Astronomical observation request
 ApJ – (publication) Astrophysical Journal
 ApJL – (publication) Astrophysical Journal Letters
 ApJS – (publication) Astrophysical Journal Supplement Series
 APM – (instrumentation/catalog), Automatic plate measuring machine, a machine for making measurements from photographic plates; also, a catalog based on measurements by the machine
 APO – (organization) Apache Point Observatory
 APOD – (data) Astronomy Picture of the Day
 APT – (telescope) Automated Patrol Telescope
 ARC – (organization) Ames Research Center
 ARC – (organization) Astrophysical Research Consortium
 ARCADE – a balloon satellite experiment to measure the heating of the Universe by the first stars and galaxies after the Big Bang
 ASA – (organization) Astronomical Society of the Atlantic
 ASAS – All Sky Automated Survey
 ASCL – Astrophysics Source Code Library, a citable online registry of research source codes
 ASI – (organization) Agenzia Spaziale Italiana
 ASIAA – (organization) Academia Sinica Institute of Astronomy and Astrophysics
 ASKAP – (telescope) Australian Square Kilometre Array Pathfinder, a next-generation radio telescope under construction in Western Australia. It differs from previous radio-telescopes in having many pixels at the focus of each antenna.
 ASP – (organization) Astronomical Society of the Pacific
 ASTRO – (spacecraft) Autonomous Space Transport Robotic Operations
 ATA – (telescope) Allen Telescope Array, a radio interferometer array developed by the SETI Institute to search for possible signals from extraterrestrial life
 ATCA – (telescope) Australia Telescope Compact Array
ATLAS – (observing program) Australia Telescope Large Area Survey, a deep radio astronomical sky survey of two SWIRE fields covering a total of about 7 square degrees of sky.
 ATM – (person) hobbyist engaged in Amateur telescope making (may also refer to the book of the same title, Amateur Telescope Making)
 AU – (measurement) Astronomical Unit, the distance between the Earth and the Sun
 AUASS – (organization) Arab Union for Astronomy and Space Sciences
 AURA – (organization) Association of Universities for Research in Astronomy
 AWCA – (meeting) American Workshop on Cometary Astronomy, an older name for the International Workshop on Cometary Astronomy
 AXP – (celestial object) Anomalous X-Ray Pulsar
 AXAF – (telescope) Advanced X-ray Astrophysics Facility, an older name for the Chandra X-ray Observatory

B 
 B – (catalog) Barnard catalog
 BAA – (organization) British Astronomical Association
 BAAS – (publication) Bulletin of the American Astronomical Society
 BAC – (catalog) Bordeaux Astrographic Catalog
 BAO – (astrophysics terminology) baryon acoustic oscillations
 BAO – (organization) Beijing Astronomical Observatory
 BASIS – (observing program) Burst and All Sky Imaging Survey
 BAT – (instrumentation) Burst Alert Telescope, an instrument on SWIFT
 BATC – (observing program) Beijing-Arizona-Taiwan-Connecticut, the name of a multi-wavelength sky survey
 BATSE – (instrument) Burst and Transient Source Experiment, an instrument on the Compton Gamma-Ray Observatory
 BATTeRS – (telescope) Bisei Asteroid Tracking Telescope for Rapid Survey
 BB – (astrophysics terminology) Black body
 BBXRT – (telescope) Broad Band X-Ray Telescope
 BCD – (celestial object) Blue compact dwarf
 BCD – (software) Basic calibrated data, data produced after basic processing
 BCEP – (celestial object) Beta CEPhei, a class of pulsating variable stars for which Beta Cephei is the archetypal object
 also BCE
 BCG – (celestial object) Blue compact galaxy, another name for a blue compact dwarf, also bright central galaxy
 BCG – (celestial object) Brightest Cluster Galaxy, the brightest galaxy in a cluster of galaxies
 BCVS – (catalog) Bibliographic Catalogue of Variable Stars
 BD – (catalog) Bonner Durchmusterung
 BD – (celestial object) Brown dwarf
 BEN – (catalog) Jack Bennett catalog, a catalog of deep-sky objects for amateur astronomers
 BEL – (celestial object) broad emission line clouds in Active galactic nucleus
 BF – (astrophysics terminology) Broadening function
 BH – (celestial object) Black hole
 BHB – (celestial object) Blue horizontal branch, a type of luminous star
 BHC – (celestial object) Black hole candidate
 BHXRT – (celestial object) Black hole x-ray transient
 also BHXT
 BICEP2 – (telescope) Background Imaging of Cosmic Extragalactic Polarization 2
 BIMA – (organization & telescope) Berkeley-Illinois-Maryland Association, and also B-M-I Array,  microwave telescope it operated
 BIS – (organization) British Interplanetary Society
 BITP – (organization) – Bogolyubov Institute for Theoretical Physics, a Ukrainian research institute
 BLAGN – (celestial object) Broad-Line AGN, based on classification of spectral line widths
 BLLAC – (celestial object) BL LACertae, a class of active galaxies for which BL Lacertae is the archetypal object
 also BLL
 BLAST – (telescope) – Balloon-borne Large Aperture Submillimeter Telescope
 BLR – (astrophysics term) the broad line region of the AGN
 BNSC – (organization) British National Space Centre, the older name for UKSA
 BOAO – (observatory) Bohyunsan Optical Astronomy Observatory, in Korea
 BOOMERanG – (telescope) Balloon Observations of Millimetric Extragalactic Radiation and Geophysics
 BPM – (catalog) Bruce proper motion
 BSG – (celestial object) Blue super giant
 BSS – (celestial object) Blue straggler star
 also BS
 BSS – (observing program) Bigelow Sky Survey
 BY – (celestial object) BY Draconis, a class of rotating variable stars for which BY Draconis is the archetypal object

C 
 C – First Cambridge Catalogue of Radio Sources, 2C (Second Cambridge Catalog), 3C (Third Cambridge Catalog)...
 CADC – (organization) Canadian Astronomy Data Centre
 CAHA – (organization) Centro Astronómico Hispano Alemán, a German-Spanish Astronomical Centre
 CANDELS – (survey) Cosmic Assembly Near-Infrared Deep Extragalactic Legacy Survey or Cosmic Assembly and Dark Energy Legacy Survey
 CAPS – (instrumentation) Cassini Plasma Spectrometer, an instrument on the Cassini spacecraft
 CARA – (organization) California Association for Research in Astronomy
 CANGAROO – Collaboration between Australian and Nippon for a Gamma Ray Observatory
 CARA – (organization) Center for Astrophysical Research in Antarctica
 CASCA – (organization) Canadian Astronomical Society / Société canadienne d'astronomie (the name is officially bilingual)
 CARMA – an array
 CASS – (organization) Center for Advanced Space Studies
 CASS – (organization) Center for Astrophysics and Space Sciences, an interdisciplinary research unit at UC San Diego
 CBAT – (organization) Central Bureau for Astronomical Telegrams
 CBE – Collisionless Boltzmann Equation
 CBR – (celestial object) cosmic background radiation
 CC – (celestial object) candidate companion, a newly detected observed object that initially appears to orbit another celestial object
 CCD – (instrumentation) Charge-coupled device
 CCD – (astrophysics terminology) – Color–color diagram, a plot that compares the differences between magnitudes in different wave bands
 CCDM – (catalog) Catalog of Components of Double and Multiple Stars
 CCO – (catalog) Catalogue of Cometary Orbits
 CCO – (celestial object) central compact object, a compact star in the center of a planetary nebula
 CCS – (celestial object) cool carbon star
 CCSFS – Cape Canaveral Space Force Station, a United States Space Force launch base
 CD – (catalog) Cordoba Durchmusterung
 CDFS – Chandra Deep Field South
 CDIMP – (catalog) Catalogue of Discoveries and Identifications of Minor Planets
 CDM – (astrophysics terminology) Cold Dark Matter, any model for structure formation in the universe that characterize "cold" particles such as WIMPs as dark matter
 CDS – (organization) Centre de Données astronomiques de Strasbourg
 CELT – (telescope) – California Extremely Large Telescope, an older name for the Thirty Meter Telescope
 CEMP – (celestial object) Carbon-enhanced metal-poor, a type of carbon star
 CEMP-no – (celestial object) Carbon-enhanced metal-poor star with no enhancement of elements produced by the r-process or s-process nucleosynthesis
 CEMP-r – (celestial object) Carbon-enhanced metal-poor star with an enhancement of elements produced by r-process nucleosynthesis
 CEMP-s – (celestial object) Carbon-enhanced metal-poor star with an enhancement of elements produced by s-process nucleosynthesis
 CEMP-r/s – (celestial object) Carbon-enhanced metal-poor star with an enhancement of elements produced by both r-process and s-process nucleosynthesis
 CEP – (celestial object) CEPheid, a type of pulsating variable star
 CEPS – (organization) Center for Earth and Planetary Studies
 CfA – (organization) Center for Astrophysics
 CFHT – (telescope) Canada–France–Hawaii Telescope
 CFRS – (observing program), Canada–France Redshift Survey
 CG – (astrophysics terminology) Center of gravity
 CG – (celestial object) Cometary Globule, a Bok globule that show signs of a tail-like extension
 CG – (celestial object) Compact galaxy
 CGCS – (celestial object) Cool galactic carbon star
 CGRO – (telescope) Compton Gamma Ray Observatory
 CGSS – (catalog) Catalogue of Galactic S Stars
 CHARA – (organization) Center for High Angular Resolution Astronomy
 CHeB – (celestial object) Core Helium Burning 
CHIPSat – Cosmic Hot Interstellar Plasma Spectrometer satellite
 CIAO – (software) Chandra Interactive Analysis of Observations, software for processing Chandra X-ray Observatory data
 CIAO – (instrumentation) Coronagraphic Imager with Adaptive Optics, an instrument for the Subaru Telescope
 CIBR – (celestial object) Cosmic infrared background radiation
 also CIB
 CIDA – (instrumentation) Cometary Interplanetary Dust Analyzer, an instrument on the Stardust spacecraft
 CINDI – Coupled Ion-Neutral Dynamics Investigation
 CINEOS – (observing program) Campo Imperatore Near-Earth Object Survey
 CIO – (catalog) Catalog of Infrared Observations
 CISCO – (instrumentation) Cooled Infrared Spectrograph and Camera for OHS, an instrument for the Subaru Telescope
 CM – (astrophysics terminology) center of mass
 CMB – (celestial object) cosmic microwave background radiation
 also CMBR, CBR, MBR
 CMC – (catalog) Carlsberg Meridian Catalogue
 CMD – (astrophysics terminology) color–magnitude diagram, the Hertzsprung–Russell diagram or similar diagrams
 also CM
 CME – coronal mass ejection
 CNB – (celestial object) cosmic neutrino background
 CNES – (organization) Centre Nationale d'Etudes Spatiales, the French Space Agency
 CNO – (astrophysics terminology) Carbon-Nitrogen-Oxygen, a sequence of nuclear fusion processes
 CNR – (organization) Consiglio Nazionale delle Ricerche
 CNSR – (spacecraft) Comet nucleus sample return
 COBE – (telescope) Cosmic Background Explorer, a space telescope used to study the cosmic microwave background radiation
 COHSI – (instrumentation) Cambridge OH-Suppression Instrument
 Col – (catalog) Collinder catalog
 COMICS – (instrumentation) COoled Mid-Infrared Camera and Spectrometer, an instrument for the Subaru Telescope
 CGRO – (telescope) COMPton TELescope, another name for the Compton Gamma Ray Observatory
 COROT – (telescope) COnvection ROtation and planetary Transits, a space telescope for detecting extrasolar planets
 COSMOS – (observing program) Cosmic Evolution Survey
 COSPAR – (organization) COmmittee on SPAce Research
 COSTAR – (instrumentation) Corrective Optics Space Telescope Axial Replacement, corrective optics for the Hubble Space Telescope
 CP – (astrophysics terminology) Chemically peculiar, stars with peculiar chemical compositions
 CPD – (catalog) Cape Photographic Durchmusterung
 CRAF – (spacecraft) Comet Rendezvous Asteroid Flyby
 CRRES – Combined Release and Radiation Effects Satellite
 CSA – (organization) Canadian Space Agency
 CSBN – (organization) Committee for Small-Body Nomenclature
 CSE – (celestial object) circumstellar envelope, a roughly spherical planetary nebula formed from dense stellar wind if not present before the formation of a star.
 CSI – (catalog) Catalog of Stellar Identification, a compilation of the catalogs, BD, CD, and CPD
 CSO – (telescope) Caltech Submillimeter Observatory
CSP – (astrophysics terminology) composite stellar population
 CSPN – (celestial object) central star of planetary nebula
 also CSPNe (plural form of CSPN)
 CSS – (observing program) Catalina Sky Survey
 CST – (astrophysics terminology) ConStanT, non-variable stars
 CSV – (catalog) Catalog of Suspected Variables
 CTIO – (telescope/organization) Cerro Tololo Interamerican Observatory
 CTTS – (celestial object) Classical T-Tauri Star
 CV – (celestial object) cataclysmic variable, a type of variable binary star system that contains a white dwarf and a companion star that changes
 CW – (celestial object) Cepheid W Virginis, a class of Cepheids named after W Virginis, the archetype for the class
 CWA – (celestial object) Cepheid W Virginis A, a subclass of CW stars that vary in brightness on timescales of less than 8 days
 CWB – (celestial object) Cepheid W Virginis B, a subclass of CW stars that vary in brightness on timescales greater than 8 days
 CXBR – (celestial object) Cosmic x-ray background radiation
 CXO – (catalog) Chandra X-ray Observation, a catalog based from the Chandra space telescope

D 
 DAO – (organization) Dominion Astrophysical Observatory
 DCEP – (celestial object) Delta CEPhei, a class of Cepheids named after Delta Cephei, the archetype for the class
 DDEB – (celestial object) double-lined eclipsing binary
 DENIS – (observing program/catalog) DEep Near Infrared Survey
 DENIS-P – (catalog) DEep Near Infrared Survey, Provisory designation [or also known as DNS].
 DES – (observing program) Dark Energy Survey
 DESI - (observing program) Dark Energy Spectroscopic Instrument
 DEC – Declination
 DES – (observing program) Deep Ecliptic Survey
 DIB – (celestial object) diffuse interstellar band, an absorption feature in stellar spectra with an interstellar origin
 DIRBE – (instrumentation) Diffuse InfraRed Background Experiment, a multiwavelength infrared detector used to map dust emission
 DISR – (instrumentation) – Descent Imager/Spectral Radiometer, an instrument on the Huygens probe
 DMR – (instrumentation) Differential Microwave Radiometer, a microwave instrument that would map variations (or anisotropies) in the CMB
DM – dark matter, the unidentified non-baryonic matter
 DN – (celestial object) Dwarf nova
 DNS – (celestial object) double neutron star, another name for a binary neutron star system. [Caution: Do not confuse with DNS relating to DENIS – Deep Near Infrared Survey].
 DOG – (celestial object) dust-obscured galaxy, a galaxy with an unusually high ratio of infrared-to-optical emission, implying strong dust absorption and re-emission.
 DPOSS – (data) Digitized Palomar Observatory Sky Survey
 DRAGN (celestial object) Double Radio Source Associated with a Galactic Nucleus
 DS – (celestial object) dwarf star
 DSCT – Delta SCuTi, a class of pulsating variable stars named after Delta Scuti, the archetype for the class
 DSN – (communications network) Deep Space Network, a network of radio antennas used for communicating to spacecraft
 DSS – (data) Digitized Sky Survey
 DSFG - (celestial object) Dusty Star Forming Galaxy
 DWE – (instrumentation) – Doppler Wind Experiment, an instrument on the Huygens probe

E 
 E – (celestial object) Eclipsing, a binary star system with variable brightness in which the stars eclipse each other
 EA – (celestial object) Eclipsing Algol, a class of eclipsing binary stars named after Algol, the archetype for the class
 EB – (celestial object) Eclipsing Beta Lyrae, a class of eclipsing binary stars named after Beta Lyrae, the archetype for the class
 EW – (celestial object) Eclipsing W Ursa Majoris, a class of eclipsing binary stars named after W Ursa Majoris, the archetype for the class
 EAAE – (organization) European Association for Astronomy Education
 EACOA – (organization) –  East Asian Core Observatories Association 
 EAO – (organization)  –  East Asian Observatory, operates the JCMT
 E-ELT – (telescope) – European Extremely Large Telescope
 EAPSNET – (organization) – East-Asian Planet Search Network
 EC – (celestial object) Embedded Cluster, a star cluster that is partially or fully embedded in interstellar gas or dust
 ECA – (celestial object) Earth-crossing asteroid
 EGG – (celestial object) evaporating gaseous globule
 EGGR – (catalog) Eggen & Greenstein, a catalog of mostly white dwarfs
EGP – (celestial object) extrasolar giant planet
 EGRET – (telescope) Energetic Gamma Ray Experiment Telescope, another name for the Compton Gamma Ray Observatory
EGS – Extended Groth Strip, a deep field
 EHB – (celestial object) extreme horizontal branch, a type of hot, evolved star
 EJASA – (publication) Electronic Journal of the Astronomical Society of the Atlantic
 EKBO – (celestial object) Edgeworth–Kuiper belt object, an alternative name for Kuiper belt objects
 ELAIS – ESO large-area infrared survey – a survey
 ELAIS – (observing program) European Large Area ISO Survey, a survey of high redshift galaxies performed with the Infrared Space Observatory (ISO)
 ELF – extremely luminous far-infrared galaxy, a synonym for Ultra-Luminous infrared galaxy
 ELT – (telescope) Extremely Large Telescope
 EMP – (catalog) Ephemerides of Minor Planets
 EMP – (celestial object) extremely metal-poor, a star with few elements other than hydrogen and helium
EMU – Evolutionary Map of the Universe
 ENACS – (observing program) ESO Nearby Abell Cluster Survey, a survey of galaxy clusters
 EPIC – (celestial object) stars and exoplanets, associated with the K2 "Second Light" plan of the Kepler space telescope
 ERO – (celestial object) extremely red object, a name applied to galaxies with red spectra
 ESA – (organization) European Space Agency
 ESO – (organization) European Southern Observatory
 ESTEC – (organization) European Space research and TEchnology Centre
 ESTRACK – (communications network) European Space TRACKing, a network of radio antennas used for communicating to spacecraft
 ETC – exposure time calculator
 EUV – (astrophysics terminology) Extreme ultraviolet
 EUVE – (telescope) Extreme UltraViolet Explorer, an ultraviolet space telescope
 EVN – (organization) European VLBI Network

F 
 FAME – (telescope) Full-sky Astrometric Mapping Explorer
 FASTT – (telescope) Flagstaff Astrometric Scanning Transit Telescope
 FCC – (catalog) Fornax Cluster Catalog,  a catalog of galaxies in the Fornax Cluster
 FEB – (celestial object) falling-evaporating body, a solid planetary object that is being evaporated by the stellar wind
 FGS – (instrumentation) fine guidance sensors, an instrument on the Hubble Space Telescope
 FHST – (instrumentation) Fixed Head Star Trackers, an instrument on the Hubble Space Telescope
 FIR – (astrophysics terminology) far infrared
 FIRST – (observing program) Faint Images of the Radio Sky at Twenty-Centimeters, a radio survey of the sky with the Very Large Array
 FIRST – (telescope) Far InfraRed and Submillimeter Space Telescope, an older name for the Herschel Space Observatory
 FIRAS – (Instrumentation) Far-InfraRed Absolute Spectrophotometer
 FIRE – (simulation project) Feedback in Realistic Environments, a project to simulate galaxy formation with detailed feedback processes included
 FITS – (software) Flexible Image Transport System, the format commonly used for scientific astronomy images
 FLAMES – (instrumentation) Fibre Large Array Multi Element Spectrograph, instrument on the VLT
 FLOAT – (telescope) Fibre-Linked Optical Array Telescope
 FLWO – (telescope) Fred L. Whipple Observatory
 FMO – (celestial object) fast moving object, an asteroid so close to the Earth that it appears to be moving very fast
 FOC – (instrumentation) Faint Object Camera, a camera formerly on the Hubble Space Telescope
 FOCAS – (instrumentation) Faint Object Camera And Spectrograph, an instrument for the Subaru Telescope
 FoM – (terminology) Figure of Merit. Used to indicate the performance of a method or device.
FORTE – Fast On-orbit Rapid Recording of Transient Events
 FOS – (instrumentation) Faint Object Spectrograph, a spectrometer formerly on the Hubble Space Telescope
 FOV – (instrumentation) field of view
 FRB – (celestial object) fast radio burst
 FRED – (astrophysics terminology) fast rise exponential decay, the variations in the luminosity of gamma ray bursts over time
 FSC – (catalog) Faint Source Catalogue, one of the catalogs produced using Infrared Astronomical Satellite data
FSRQ – (celestial object) Flat Spectrum Radio Quasars
 FTL – (astrophysics terminology) faster than light
 FUOR – (celestial object) FU Orionis objects,  a class of variable pre–main sequence stars named after FU Orionis, the archetype for the class
 also FU
 FUSE – (telescope) Far Ultraviolet Spectroscopic Explorer, an ultraviolet space telescope
 FUVITA – (instrumentation) Far UltraViolet Imaging Telescope Array, an ultraviolet imager for the Spectrum-Roentgen-Gamma mission
 FWHM – (instrumentation) full width at half maximum, a telescope resolution
 FWZI – (instrumentation) full width at zero intensity, a telescopes resolution

G 
 G – (catalog) Giclas, a catalog of nearby stars
 GAIA – (telescope) Global Astrometric Interferometer for Astrophysics, a space telescope that is used to make high-precision measurements of stars
 GALEX – (telescope) Galaxy Evolution Explorer, an ultraviolet space telescope
 GALEXASC – GALaxy Evolution eXplorer all-sky catalog
 GASP – (software) Guide star Astrometric Support Package
 GAT – (catalog) AO (Gatewood+), catalog of G. Gatewood's observations
 GBM – (instrumentation) Gamma-Ray Burst Monitor, a set of gamma ray detectors on the Fermi Gamma-Ray Space Telescope
 GBT – (telescope) Green Bank Telescope
 GC – (catalog) General Catalog, a catalog of clusters, nebulae, and galaxies created by John Herschel and now superseded by the New General Catalogue, also globular cluster
 GCAS – (celestial object) Gamma CASsiopeiae, a class of eruptive variable stars named after Gamma Cassiopeiae, the archetype for the class
 GCMS – (instrumentation) – Gas Chromatograph and Mass Spectrometer, an instrument on the Huygens probe
 also GC/MS
 GCN – (organization) GRB Coordinates Network
 GCR – (astrophysics terminology) galactic cosmic rays
 GCVS – (catalog) the General Catalog of Variable Stars
 GD – (catalog) Giclas Dwarf, a catalog of white dwarf
 GDS – (celestial object) Great Dark Spot, a transient feature in the clouds of Neptune
 GEM – (observing program) Galactic Emission Mapping
 GEM – (observing program) Galileo Europa Mission, the science observation program of Europa performed by the Galileo spacecraft
 GEM – (observing program) Giotto Extended Mission, the extended operations of the Giotto spacecraft
 GEMS – (organization) Group Evolution Multi-wavelength Study
 GEMS – (survey) Galaxy Evolution from Morphology and Spectral energy distributions
 GEMSS – (organization) Global Exoplanet M-dwarf Search-Survey, a search for exoplanets around m-dwarf stars
 GEODDS – (telescope) Ground-based Electro-Optical Deep Space Surveillance, a network of telescopes used in a United States Air Force program for observing space junk
 GEOS – (organization) Groupe Européen Observations Stellaires, an amateur and professional association for study of variable stars.
 GERLUMPH – (instrumentation) GPU-Enabled, High Resolution MicroLensing Parameter survey, where GPU is an acronym for Graphics Processing Unit.
 GH – (catalog) Giclas Hyades, a catalog of stars in the Hyades cluster
 GHRS – (instrumentation) Goddard High Resolution Spectrograph, a spectrograph on the Hubble Space Telescope
 also HRS
 GIA – (organization) Gruppo Italiano Astrometristi
 GIMI – (instrumentation) Global Imaging Monitor of the Ionosphere, an ultraviolet imager on the Advanced Research and Global Observation Satellite
 GJ – (catalog) Gliese & Jahreiß/Jahreiss nearby star catalog
 GL – (catalog) Gliese nearby star catalog
 GLAST – (telescope) Gamma-ray Large Area Space Telescope
 GLIMPSE – (observing program) Galactic Legacy Infrared Mid-Plane Survey Extraordinaire
 GMC – (celestial object) Giant molecular cloud
 GMF – (celestial object) Galactic magnetic field
 GMRT – (telescope) – Giant Metrewave Radio Telescope - Pune, India
 GMT – (telescope) – Giant Magellan Telescope, a telescope being built by a US-Australian collaboration
 GONG – (organization) Global Oscillation Network Group, an organization that monitors oscillations in the Sun
 GOLD – Global-scale Observations of the Limb and Disk
 GOODS – (survey) Great Observatories Origins Deep Survey a survey of various redshifts to study galactic formation and evolution
 GP – (astrophysics terminology) giant pulses, a type of observed pulse emission from pulsars
 GPS – (astrophysics teminology) GHz-peaked spectrum, the radio or microwave spectra of some galaxies
 GR – (astrophysics terminology) general relativity
 GR – (catalog) Giclas Red dwarf, a catalog of red dwarfs
 GRB – (celestial object) gamma ray burst
 GRO – (telescope) Gamma Ray Observatory, another name for the Compton Gamma Ray Observatory
 GROSCE – (telescope) Gamma Ray Burst Optical Counterparts Search Experiment, an automated telescope used to detect the optical counterparts to gamma ray bursts
 GRS – (instrumentation) Gamma Ray Spectrometer, an instrument on the Mars Observer
 GRS – (celestial object) Great Red Spot, a feature in the clouds of Jupiter
 GSC – (catalog) Guide Star Catalog, a catalog of stars used for pointing the Hubble Space Telescope
 GSC2 – (catalog) Guide Star Catalog version 2, a catalog of stars used for pointing the Hubble Space Telescope
 also GSC II
 GSFC – (organization) Goddard Space Flight Center, a NASA institution
 GSPC – (catalog) Guide Star Photometric Catalog, a catalog of stars with precisely measured fluxes used to calibrate the Guide Star Catalog
 GTC – (telescope) Gran Telescopio Canarias, the 10.4 m reflecting telescope on the island of La Palma, Canary Islands, Spain
 GW – (celestial object) – Gravitational Wave.

H 
 HAeBe – (celestial object) Herbig AeBe star, a type of pre-main-sequence star with strong spectral emission lines
 HAe – (celestial object) Herbig Ae star
 HBe – (celestial object) Herbig Be star
 HALCA – (telescope) Highly Advanced Laboratory for Communications and Astronomy, a satellite that is part of the VLBI Space Observatory Program, a Japanese radio astronomy project
 HAO – (organization) high-altitude observatory
 HARPS – (instrumentation) High Accuracy Radial velocity Planet Searcher, a high-precision spectrograph installed on the ESO 3.6 m Telescope
 HASI – (instrumentation) Huygens Atmosphere Structure Instrument, an instrument on the Huygens probe
 HB – (celestial object) horizontal branch, a type of evolved red giant star in which helium is burned in the core and hydrogen is burned in a shell around the core
 HBRP – (celestial object) High-magnetic field radio pulsar
 HBV – (catalog) Hamburg–Bergedorf Variables, a catalog of variable stars
 HBMM – (astrophysics terminology) Hydrogen-burning minimum mass
 HCG – Hickson Compact Group
 HCO – (organization) Harvard College Observatory
 HCS – (celestial object) heliospheric current sheet, the boundary where the polarity of the Sun's magnetic field changes direction
 HD – (catalog) Henry Draper, a catalog of stars
 HDE – (catalog) Henry Draper Extension, a catalog of stars
 HDF – (data/celestial object) Hubble Deep Field, an area of the sky with little foreground obscuration that was observed deeply with the Hubble Space Telescope; also the name for the data product itself
 HDFS – Hubble Deep Field South
 HDM – (astrophysics terminology) hot dark matter, any model for structure formation in the universe that characterizes neutrinos as dark matter
 HDS – (instrumentation) High Dispersion Spectrograph, a spectrograph on the Subaru Telescope
 HE – (catalog) Hamburg/ESO Survey
 HEAO – (telescope) High Energy Astronomical Observatory, a series of X-ray and gamma ray space telescopes
 HEASARC – (organization) High Energy Astrophysics Science Archive Research Center, a NASA organization that deals with X-ray and gamma ray telescope data
 HerMES - (observing program) Herschel Multitiered Extragalactic Survey, a legacy survey of star forming galaxies using the SPIRE and PACS instrument of Herschel
 HESS – (telescope) High Energy Stereoscopic System, a telescope for detecting cosmic rays
 HET – Hobby–Eberly Telescope
 HETE – (telescope) High Energy Transient Explorer, a space telescope that performs multi-wavelength observations of gamma-ray bursts
 HF – (astrophysics terminology) High frequency
 HGA – (instrumentation) High gain antenna
 HH – (celestial object) Herbig–Haro object, objects formed when the ejecta from new stars collides with the interstellar medium
 also HHO
 HIC – (catalog) HIPPARCOS Input Catalog, a catalog of data for the first target stars selected for observation by the Hipparcos 
 HICAT – (catalog) HIPASS catalog, a catalog of HI sources, see also NHICAT
 HID – (astrophysics terminology) – hardness–intensity diagram, a type of color–magnitude diagram used in X-ray and gamma-ray astronomy
 HIP – (catalog) HIPPARCOS, the catalog of data produced by Hipparcos
 HIPASS – (Observing program) HI Parkes All-Sky Survey, survey of HI sources
 HIPPARCOS – (telescope) HIgh Precision PARallax COllecting Satellite, a space telescope specifically designed to measure distances to stars using parallax
 HISA – (astrophysical terminology) HI self-absorption region
 HIRAX – (telescope) Hydrogen Intensity and Real-time Analysis eXperiment, an interferometric array of 1024 6-meter (20ft) diameter radio telescopes to be built in South Africa
 HK – (catalog) Survey for metal-poor stars based on the strength of CaII H and K absorption lines
 HLIRG – (celestial object) Hyperluminous infrared galaxy, a galaxy that is brighter than 1013 solar luminosities in the infrared
 HMC – (instrumentation) Halley Multicolor Camera, an instrument on the Giotto spacecraft
 HMGB – (celestial object) High-mass gamma-ray binary, a Gamma ray-luminous binary system consisting of a compact star and a massive star
 HMPO – (celestial object) High-mass proto-stellar object
 HMXB – (celestial object) High-mass x-ray binary, an X-ray-luminous binary system consisting of a compact star and a massive star
 HOPS – The H2O southern Galactic Plane Survey
 HPMS – (celestial object) high proper motion star, a star with high proper motion
 HR – (catalog) Hoffleit Bright Star
 HR – (astrophysics terminology) Hertzsprung–Russell, a diagram that compares stars' colors to their luminosities
 HRC-I – (instrumentation) High Resolution Camera, an instrument on the Chandra X-ray Observatory
 HRD – (instrumentation) High Rate Detector, an instrument on the Cassini spacecraft
 HRMS – (observing program) High Resolution Microwave Survey, a survey for microwave signals from extraterrestrial intelligence
 HRI – (instrumentation) High Resolution Imager, an instrument on the ROSAT telescope
 HSP – (instrumentation) High Speed Photometer, an instrument formerly on the Hubble Space Telescope
 HST – (telescope) Hubble Space Telescope
 HTRA – (astrophysics terminology) High time-resolution astrophysics, the observations of phenomena that vary on timescales of one second or less
 HUT – (telescope) Hopkins Ultraviolet Telescope, an ultraviolet telescope that operated from the cargo bay of the Space Shuttle
 HVC – (celestial object) high-velocity cloud, an interstellar cloud with a velocity that is too high to be explained by galactic rotation
 HXD – (instrumentation) Hard X-ray Detector, an instrument on the Suzaku space telescope
 HVS – (celestial object) hypervelocity star or high velocity star

I 
 IAC – (organization) Instituto de Astrofisica de Canarias
 IAPPP – (organization) International Amateur/Professional Photoelectric Photometry
 IAS – (organization) Istituto di Astrofisica Spaziale
 IASY – (observing program) International Active Sun Year, the name given to a series of coordinated Sun-related observational programs performed in 1969 and 1971
 IAU – (organization) International Astronomical Union
 IAUC – (publication) IAU Circular
 IAYC – (meeting) International Astronomical Youth Camp
 IBAS – (instrumentation) – INTEGRAL Burst Alert System, an instrument on the INTEGRAL satellite
 IBIS – (instrumentation) – Imager on Board the INTEGRAL Satellite, an instrument on the INTEGRAL satellite
 IBVS – (publication) Information Bulletin on Variable Stars
 IC – (catalog) Index Catalog
 IC – (celestial object) Intracluster, either the regions between stars in star clusters or the region between galaxies in galaxy clusters
 ICE – (spacecraft) International Comet Explorer
 ICM – (celestial object) intracluster medium, is the superheated gas present at the center of a galaxy cluster
 ICQ – (publication) International Comet Quarterly
 ICRF – (astrophysics terminology) International Celestial Reference Frame, a coordinate system based on radio sources used to define the locations of objects in the sky
 ICRS – (astrophysics terminology) International Celestial Reference System, a coordinate system based on Hipparcos observations used to define the locations of objects in the sky
 IDA – (organization) International Dark-Sky Association, an organization that seeks to control light pollution
 IDP – (celestial object) Interplanetary Dust Particle, dust particles around planets or planetary bodies
 IDS – (catalog) Index Catalog of Double Stars
 IEO – (astrophysics terminology) inner-Earth object, the orbits of asteroids
 IERS – (organization) International Earth Rotation geophysical Service or International Earth rotation and Reference systems Service, an organization that monitors the Earth's orientation with respect to the radio sources used to define the ICRF
 IfA: either Institute for Astronomy (Hawaii) or Institute for Astronomy, School of Physics and Astronomy, University of Edinburgh, Scotland
 IFN – (celestial object) integrated flux nebulae, dust and gas outside the plane of the Milky Way, which are thus illuminated by the entire galaxy as opposed to a nearby star or stars
 IGM – (celestial object) intergalactic medium
 IGR – (catalog) Integral Gamma-Ray source, a catalog based on observations by the INTEGRAL telescope
 IGY – (observing program) International Geophysical Year, the name given to a series of coordinated geophysical and astronomical observation programs performed in 1957 and 1958
 IHW – (organization) International Halley Watch, an organization created to coordinate observations of Halley's Comet in 1986
 ILOM – (spacecraft) In-situ Lunar Orientation Measurement, a mission to measure variations in the orientation of the Moon from the Moon's surface
 IMAGE – Imager for Magnetopause-to-Aurora Global Exploration
 IMBH – (celestial object) intermediate mass black hole
 IMF – (astrophysics terminology) initial mass function, the relative numbers of stars of different masses that form during star formation
 IMO – (organization) International Meteor Organization
 IMPACT – (meeting) International Monitoring Programs for Asteroid and Comet Threat
 IMPS – (observing program) IRAS Minor Planet Survey
 INAG – (organization) Institut National d'Astronomie et de Geophysique
 ING – (organization) Isaac Newton Group of Telescopes
 INS – (celestial object) Isolated Neutron Star
 INT – (telescope) Isaac Newton Telescope
 INTEGRAL – (telescope) INTErnational Gamma-Ray Astrophysics Laboratory, a gamma-ray space telescope
 IoA – (organization) Institute of Astronomy, an astronomy research department at Cambridge University
 IOTA – (telescope) Infrared Optical Telescope Array
 IOTA – (organization) International Occultation Timing Association, an organization for monitoring occultations
 IPAC – (organization) Infrared Processing & Analysis Center
 IPMO – (celestial object) Isolated Planetary Mass Objects, another name for isolated planemos or sub-brown dwarfs
 IQSY – (observing program) International Quiet Sun Year, the name given to a series of coordinated Sun-related observational programs performed in 1964 and 1965
 IR – (astrophysics terminology) InfraRed
 IRAC – (instrumentation) Infrared Array Camera, a mid-infrared imager on the Spitzer Space Telescope
 IRAF – (software) Image Reduction and Analysis Facility, a general-purpose professional data-processing package
 IRAIT – (telescope) – International Robotic Antarctic Infrared Telescope
 IRAM – (organization) Institut de Radio Astronomie Millimetrique
 IRAS – (telescope/catalog) InfraRed Astronomical Satellite, an infrared space telescope; also the catalog produced using the telescope's data
 IRCS – (instrumentation) InfraRed Camera and Spectrograph, an instrument on the Subaru Telescope
 IRDC – (celestial object) Infrared Dark Cloud
 IRS – (instrumentation) InfraRed Spectrograph, an infrared spectrometer on the Spitzer Space Telescope
 IRSA – (organization) Infrared Science Archive
 IRTF – (telescope) InfraRed Telescope Facility
 IRX – (astrophysical terminology) InfraRed Excess
 ISAS – (organization) Institute of Space and Astronautical Science
 ISAS – (organization) Institute of Space and Atmospheric Studies, a research unit at the University of Saskatchewan
ISCO – (astrophysical terminology) Innermost Stable Circular Orbit
 ISEE – (spacecraft) International Sun-Earth Explorer, a series of spacecraft designed to study the effects of the Sun on the Earth's space environment and magnetosphere
 ISGRI – (instrumentation) – INTEGRAL Soft Gamma-Ray Imager, an instrument on the INTEGRAL satellite
 ISM – (celestial object) InterStellar Medium
 ISN – (organization) International Supernovae Network
 ISO – (telescope) Infrared Space Observatory
ISON – International Scientific Optical Network
 ISPM – (spacecraft) International Solar Polar Mission, another name for the Ulysses spacecraft
 ISRO – (organization) Indian Space Research Organisation
 ISSA – (data) Infrared Sky Survey Atlas, an atlas compiled from Infrared Astronomical Satellite data
 ISTeC – (organization) International Small Telescope Cooperative
 ISY – (observing program/meeting) International Space Year, the name given to a celebration of space exploration as well as a series of coordinated astronomical observations and a series of meetings to plan future astronomy research efforts
 ITA – (organization) Institute of Theoretical Astronomy, one of three organizations that was combined to form the Institute of Astronomy
 IUCAA – (organization) Inter-University Centre for Astronomy and Astrophysics - Pune, India
 IUE – (telescope) International Ultraviolet Explorer, an ultraviolet space telescope
 IUEDAC – (organization) IUE satellite Data Analysis Center
 IWCA – (meeting) International Workshop on Cometary Astronomy

J 
 Janskys – (publication) Green Bank Observatory
 JAC – (publication) Japan Astronomical Circular 
 JAC – (organization) Joint Astronomy Centre, the organization that operates the United Kingdom Infrared Telescope and the James Clerk Maxwell Telescope
 JAPOA – (organization) Japan Amateur Photoelectric Observers Association
 JAXA – (organization) Japan Aerospace eXploration Agency
JBO – Jodrell Bank Observatory, a radio observatory in England.
 JCMT – (telescope) James Clerk Maxwell Telescope
 JD – (astrophysics terminology) Julian Date, an alternative time commonly used in astronomy
 JET-X – (telescope) Joint European Telescope for X-ray astronomy
 JGR – (publication) Journal of Geophysical Research
 JILA – (organization) formerly Joint Institute for Laboratory Astrophysics
JIVE – Joint Institute for VLBI in Europe
 JKT – (telescope) Jacobus Kapteyn Telescope
 JPL – (organization) Jet Propulsion Laboratory, a research center associated with NASA
 JSGA – (telescope/organization) Japan SpaceGuard Association, a Japanese telescope used to track near-Earth asteroids and space junk
 JWST – (telescope) James Webb Space Telescope, an infrared space telescope

K 

 KAIT – (telescope) Katzman Automatic Imaging Telescope
 KAO – (telescope) Kuiper Airborne Observatory
 KBO – (celestial object) Kuiper belt object
 KCAO – (organization) Kumamoto Civil Astronomical Observatory
 KIC – (catalog) Kepler Input Catalog, a catalog of stars with potential extrasolar planets to be observed by the Kepler Mission
 KPNO – (organization) Kitt Peak National Observatory
 KS – (astrophysics terminology) Kennicutt-Schmidt relation

L 
 L – (astrophysics terminology) Lagrange, Lagrange points
 L – (catalog) Luyten, a catalog of proper motion measurements of stars
 LAD-C – (instrumentation) Large Area Debris Collector, a canceled program that was to collect and catalog low orbital dust on the International Space Station
 LAEFF – (organization) Laboratorio de Astrofisica Espacial y Fisica Fundamental, a Spanish astronomy research organization
 LAL – (catalog) LALande, a historical catalog of stars
 LAMOST – (telescope) Large sky Area Multi-Object fiber Spectroscopic Telescope
 LANL – (organization) Los Alamos National Laboratory
 LASCO – (instrumentation) Large Angle and Spectrometric COronagraph, an instrument on the Solar and Heliospheric Observatory
 Laser – (instrumentation) light amplification by stimulated emission of radiation
 LAT – (instrumentation) Large Area Telescope, on the Fermi Gamma-ray Space Telescope
 LBN – (catalog) Lynds Bright Nebula, a catalog of bright nebulae
 LBG - (celestial object) Lyman Break Galaxy, a galaxy identified using the Lyman-break selection technique
 LBNL – (organization) Lawrence Berkeley National Laboratory
 LBT – (telescope) Large Binocular Telescope
 LBV – (celestial object) luminous blue variable, a type of very bright variable star
 LCDM – (astrophysics terminology) Lambda cold dark matter, any model for structure formation in the universe that includes dark energy
 also ΛCDM
 LCO — (observatory) Las Campanas Observatory, Atacama Region in Chile
 LCOGT – network of autonomous robotic telescopes (2m, 1m and 40 cm) at 7 sites in both hemispheres
 LCROSS – (spacecraft) Lunar CRater Observation and Sensing Satellite
 LCRS – (observing program) Las Campanas Redshift Survey
 LDN – (catalog) Lynds Dark Nebula, a catalog of dark nebulae
 LDN – (celestial object) large dark nebula, a large, wispy nebula made of neutral brown hydrogen gas.
 LDS – (catalog) Luyten Double Star
 LDSS3 — (spectrograph) Low Dispersion Survey Spectrograph, from Magellan 2 Clay Telescope at LCO.
 LEO – (astrophysics terminology) low Earth orbit
 LEST – (telescope) large Earth-based solar telescope
 LETGS – (instrumentation) Low Energy Transmission Gratings Spectrometer, an instrument on the Chandra X-Ray Observatory
 also LETG
 LF – (astrophysics terminology) luminosity function, the spatial density of objects such as star clusters and galaxies as a function of their luminosity
 LFT – (catalog) Luyten Five-Tenths, a catalog of stars with proper motions exceeding 0.5"
 LGA – (instrumentation) low-gain antenna
 LGM – (celestial object) 	Little Green Men, a humorous name applied to pulsars soon after their discovery
 LHEA – (organization) Laboratory for High Energy Astrophysics
 LHS – (catalog) Luyten Half-Second, a catalog of stars with proper motions exceeding 0.5"
 LIC – (celestial object) Local Interstellar Cloud, the cloud in the interstellar medium through which the Solar System is currently moving
 LIGO – (telescope) Laser Interferometer Gravitational Wave Observatory, an instrument for detecting gravitational waves
 LINEAR – (observing program) Lincoln Near-Earth Asteroid Research
 LINER – (celestial object) low-ionization nuclear emission region, a galactic nucleus that is characterized by spectral line emission from weakly ionized gas
 LIRG – (celestial object) luminous infrared galaxy, a galaxy that is between 1011 and 1012 solar luminosities in the infrared
 LISA – (telescope) Laser Interferometer Space Antenna, a series of spacecraft that can be used to detect gravitational waves
 LLAGN – (celestial object) low-luminosity active galactic nucleus, an active galactic nucleus with a low luminosity
 LLNL – (organization) Lawrence Livermore National Laboratory
 LMC – (celestial object) Large Magellanic Cloud, an irregular galaxy near the Milky Way
 LMS – (celestial object) Lower main sequence star, the less massive hydrogen-burning main-sequence stars
 LMXB – (celestial object) low-mass x-ray binary, an X-ray-luminous binary star system in which one of the stars is a neutron star or black hole that is stripping material away from the other star in the system
 LN2 – (instrumentation) liquid nitrogen
LOAN – Longitude of ascending node
 LOFAR – (telescope) LOw Frequency ARray, for radio astronomy
 LONEOS – (observing program) Lowell Observatory Near-Earth Object Search
 LOSS – (observing program) Lick Observatory Supernova Search
 LOTIS – (telescope) Livermore Optical Transient Imaging System, a telescope designed to find the optical counterparts of gamma ray bursts
 LOTOSS – (observing program) Lick Observatory and Tenagra Observatory Supernova Searches
 LP – (catalog) Luyten Palomar, a catalog of proper motion measurements of stars 
 LPI – (organization) Lunar and Planetary Institute
 LPL – (organization) Lunar and Planetary Laboratory, the planetary science department of the University of Arizona
 LPV – (celestial object) Long Period Variable, a type of variable star that changes in brightness slowly over time
 LRG – (celestial object) luminous red galaxy, a dataset of galaxies from the Sloan Digital Sky Survey that were selected on the basis of their red colors
 LRO – (spacecraft) Lunar Reconnaissance Orbiter
 LSR – (astrophysics terminology) local standard of rest, the frame of reference with a velocity equal to the average velocity of all the stars in the solar neighborhood, including the Sun
 LSST – (telescope) Legacy Survey of Space and Time
 LST – (astrophysics terminology) local sidereal time, the right ascension that is currently at the zenith
 LT – (telescope) Liverpool Telescope
 LTE – (astrophysics terminology) Local Thermodynamic Equilibrium, a state where variations in temperature, pressure, etc. do not vary on small scales
 LTP – (astrophysics terminology) Lunar Transient Phenomenon, an observed event (such as a flash of light) on the surface of the Moon
 LTT – (catalog) Luyten Two-Tenths, a catalog of proper motion measurements for stars
 LWS - (instrumentation) Long Wavelength Spectrometer, a spectrometer on the ISO

 M 
 MARVEL – (project) Multi-object Apache Point Observatory Radial Velocity Exoplanet Large-area Survey, a NASA-funded project to search for exoplanets M – (catalog) Messier
 M – (celestial object) Mira, a class of long period pulsating variable stars named after Mira, the archetype for the class MAC – (observing program) Multi-instrument Aircraft Campaign, a program to study the cometary dust from the Leonids meteor showers MACHO – (celestial object/observing program/catalog) MAssive Compact Halo Object, an object in the Milky Way's halo thought to comprise part of the galaxy's dark matter; also a survey to detect these sources through gravitational lensing and the catalog of sources detected by the survey MACS – (catalogue) Magellanic Catalogue of Stars
 MAGIC – (telescope) Major Atmospheric Gamma-ray Imaging Cherenkov telescope
 MALT – Millimetre Astronomy Legacy Team – including  and MALT45
 MAP – (telescope) Microwave-background Anisotropy Probe, an older name for the Wilkinson Microwave Anisotropy Probe MASER – (astrophysics terminology) microwave amplification by stimulated emission of radiation, microwave emission that is similar to the optical emission from a laserMAVEN – Mars Atmosphere and Volatile EvolutioN
 MBA – (celestial object) main belt asteroid
 MBH – (celestial object) massive black hole
 MCG – (catalog) Morphological Catalog of Galaxies
 MCMC - (astrophysics terminology) Markov chain Monte Carlo
 MCO – (spacecraft) Mars Climate Orbiter
 MDS – (observing program) Medium Deep Survey, a survey of high-redshift galaxies with the Hubble Space Telescope MECO – (celestial object) magnetospheric eternally collapsing object, a type of object proposed as an alternative to supermassive black holes as the central compact source within active galactic nuclei MEPAG – (organization) Mars Exploration Program Analysis Group
 MEPCO – (meeting) Meeting of European Planetary and Cometary Observers
 MER – (spacecraft) Mars Exploration Rover
MERLIN – Multi Element Radio Linked Interferometer. A seven-telescope radio interferometer
MESSENGER – MErcury Surface, Space ENvironment, GEochemistry and Ranging
 MGC – (catalog/observing program) Millennium Galaxy Catalogue
 MGS – (spacecraft) Mars Global Surveyor
 MHD – (astrophysics terminology) MagnetoHydroDynamic
 MICO – (software) Multi-year Interactive Computer Almanac, astronomy almanac software created by the United States Naval Observatory MIDI – MID-Infrared instrument. A mid-infrared instrument of the VLTI
 MIPS – (instrumentation) Multi-band Imaging Photometer, an instrument on the Spitzer Space Telescope MIRI –  (instrumentation) Mid-Infrared Instrument, an instrument on the James Webb Telescope MJD – (astrophysics terminology) Modified Julian Date, the Julian date minus 2400000.5 MLO – (organization)
 MMO – (spacecraft) Mercury Magnetospheric Orbiter, JAXA space probe to Mercury MMR – (astrophysics terminology) Mean-Motion Resonance
MMS – Magnetospheric Multiscale Mission
 MMSN – Minimum Mass Solar Nebula
 MMT – (telescope) Multiple Mirror Telescope
 MNRAS – (publication) Monthly Notices of the Royal Astronomical Society
 MO – (spacecraft) Mars Observer
 MOA – (observing program) Microlensing Observations in Astrophysics, a survey searching for gravitational lenses MOC – (instrumentation) Mars Observer Camera, an instrument on the Mars Observer MOID – (astrophysics terminology) minimum orbit intersection distance, the minimum distance between two objects' orbital paths MOLA – (instrumentation) Mars Observer Laser Altimeter, an instrument on the Mars Observer used to study Mars's topology MOND – (astrophysics terminology) modified Newtonian dynamics
 MONS – (telescope) Measuring Oscillations in Nearby Stars, a Danish space telescope that was proposed and designed but not built MOST – (telescope) Microvariability and Oscillations of STars, a space telescope designed to detect oscillations in the atmospheres of stars and extrasolar planetss in orbit around other stars MOST – (telescope) Molonglo Observatory Synthesis Telescope, an Australian radio telescope MOTIF – (telescope) Maui Optical Tracking and Identification Facility
 MOXE – (instrumentation) Monitoring X-ray Experiment, an X-ray all-sky monitor designed for the Spectrum-X-Gamma satellite MPC – (publication) Minor Planet Circulars (also called Minor Planets and Comets)
 MPEC – (publication) Minor Planet Electronic Circular
 MPF – (spacecraft) Mars PathFinder
 MPL – (spacecraft) Mars Polar Lander
 MPO – (space craft) Mercury Planetary Orbiter, ESA space craft to Mercury MPP – (instrumentation) Multi-Pinned-Phase, CCD technology that reduces dark current noise MPCS – (publication) Minor Planet Circulars Supplement
 MPS – (observing project) Microlensing Planet Search, a program designed that detect extrasolar planets using a gravitational lensing technique MRI – (astrophysics term) magnetorotational instability, a local instability in the accretion disks which only requires weak magnetic field and dΩ2/dR<0
MRK – Markarian galaxies
 MRO – (spacecraft) Mars Reconnaissance Orbiter
MSL – Mars Science Laboratory
 MSP – (celestial object) millisecond pulsar
 MSSS – (organization) Maui Space Surveillance Site
 MSX – (telescope) Midcourse Space EXperiment, an infrared space telescope MSSSO – (organization) Mount Stromlo and Siding Spring Observatories
 MUNICS – (observing program) MUnich Near-Infrared Cluster Survey
 MUSES – (spacecraft) MU Space Engineering Spacecraft, a Japanese science-related spacecraft launched in a Mu rocket MUSTANG – (instrumentation) Multiplexed SQUID TES Array at Ninety GHz, A bolometer camera on the Green Bank Telescope. MUSYC – (observing program) Multi-wavelength Survey by Yale-Chile
 MW – (celestial object) Milky Way
 MWD – (celestial object) magnetic white dwarf
 MXRB – (celestial object) massive x-ray binary, an x-ray-luminous binary system consisting of a compact star and a very massive star MYSO – (celestial object) massive young stellar object

 N 
 N – (celestial object) nova
 NACA – (organization) National Advisory Committee on Aeronautics, the older name for NASA NAMN – (organization) North American Meteor Network
 NAOJ – (organization) National Astronomical Observatory of Japan
 NAS – (organization) Norsk Astronomisk Selskap, the Norwegian name for the Norwegian Astronomical Society NASA – (organization) National Aeronautics and Space Administration
 NASDA – (organization) NAtional Space Development Agency
 NBS – (organization) National Bureau of Standards, an older name for the National Institute of Standards and Technology NCT –  (telescope) Nuclear Compton Telescope – a balloon-borne soft gamma-ray (0.2-15 MeV) telescope.
 NEAP – (spacecraft) Near Earth Asteroid Prospector, a space probe used to study a near-Earth asteroid NEAR – (spacecraft) Near Earth Asteroid Rendezvous, a space probe used to study a near-Earth asteroid NEAT – (observing program) Near-Earth Asteroid Tracking
 NED – (software) NASA/IPAC Extragalactic Database
 NEO – (celestial object) Near-Earth object
 also NEA – (celestial object) Near-Earth asteroid
 NEMP – (celestial object) nitrogen-enhanced metal-poor star, a type of carbon star with high amounts of nitrogen NEODyS – (organization) Near Earth Objects Dynamic Site, an Italian web-based service that provides information on near-Earth asteroids NEOIC – (organization) Near Earth Object Information Center, a United Kingdom organization that provides information on near-Earth asteroidsNEOWISE – Near-Earth Object WISE
 NESS – (telescope) Near Earth Space Surveillance, a telescope for observing near-Earth asteroids NESSI – (organization) Near Earth Space Surveillance Initiative, a collaboration planning to use a ground-based telescope to observe near-Earth asteroids NGC – (catalog) New General Catalog
NGS-POSS – National Geographic Society – Palomar Observatory Sky Survey
 NGST – (telescope) Next Generation Space Telescope, an older name for the James Webb Space Telescope ngVLA – (telescope) Next-Generation Very Large Array
 NHICAT – (catalog) Northern HIPASS CATalog, the northern extension of the HIPASS catalogue NICMOS – (instrumentation) Near Infrared Camera / Multi Object Spectrometer, an infrared instrument on the Hubble Space Telescope NIMS – (instrumentation) Near-Infrared Mapping Spectrometer, an instrument on the Galileo spacecraft NIR – (astrophysics terminology) near-infrared
 NIRCam – (Instrument), Near-Infrared Camera, an instrument on James Webb Telescope NIRSpec – (instrument) Near-Infrared Spectrograph, an instrument on James Webb Telerscope NIST – (organization) National Institute of Standards and Technology
 NLAGN – (celestial object) Narrow-Line AGN, classified based on lack of broadened emission or absorption lines in spectra
NLR – (astrophysics term) the Narrow Line Region of the AGN
 NLTE – (astrophysics terminology) non-local thermodynamic equilibrium, situations where the temperature, pressure, etc. of a system are not in equilibrium NLTT – (catalog) New Luyten Two-Tenths, a catalog of stars with high proper motions NNVS – Nizhny Novgorod, Veränderliche Sterne; a variable star publication of the Nizhny Novgorod Society of Physics and Astronomy Amateurs
 NOAA – (organization) National Oceanic and Atmospheric Administration
 NOAO – (organization) National Optical Astronomy Observatories
 NODO – (telescope) NASA Orbital Debris Observatory, a now-defunct telescope used to observe space junk and other objects NOT – (telescope) NOrdic Telescope
 NPS – (celestial object) North Polar Sequence, a series of stars near the north celestial pole once used as standards for measuring magnitudesNRAL – Nuffield Radio Astronomy Laboratory, the former name for Jodrell
 NRAO – (organization) National Radio Astronomy Observatory
 NRL – (organization) Naval Research Laboratory
 NS – (celestial object) neutron star
 NSF – (organization) National Science Foundation
 NSO – (organization) National Solar Observatory
 NSSDC – (organization) National Space Science Data Center
 NSV – (catalog) New Suspected Variable, a catalog of variable stars NT – (astrophysics terminology) Non-Thermal, radiation that is not related to the emission source's temperature (such as synchrotron radiation) NTT – (telescope) New Technology Telescope, a telescope operated by the European Southern ObservatoryNuSTAR – Nuclear Spectroscopic Telescope Array
NVSS – NRAO VLA Sky Survey, a major survey

 O 
 OAO – (observatory) Okayama Astrophysical Observatory, in Japan OAO – (telescope) Orbiting Astronomical Observatory, a series of satellites with astronomical instruments that operated in the 1970s OC – (celestial object) open cluster, a cluster of stars OCA – (organization) Observatoire de la Côte d'Azur
 OCO – (celestial object) Oort Cloud Object, an object (usually a comet) in the Oort cloud OGLE – (observing program/catalog) Optical Gravitational Lensing Experiment, an observing program to survey the sky for microlensing events; also the catalog of sources produced by the project BLG – (catalog) BuLGe, used to designate a source detected in the direction of the bulge of the Milky Way TR – (catalog) TRansit, used to designate a potential observation of a microlensing event caused by a transiting star OPAG – (organization) Outer Planets Assessment Group, a group established by NASA that provides advice on Solar System exploration ORFEUS – (telescope) Orbiting and Retrievable Far and Extreme Ultraviolet Spectrometer, an ultraviolet space telescope that could be released and later retrieved by the Space ShuttleOSIRIS-REx – Origins Spectral Interpretation Resource Identification Security Regolith Explorer
 OSS – (observing program) Ohio Sky Survey
 OSSE – (instrumentation) Oriented Scintillation Spectrometer Experiment, an instrument on the Compton Gamma Ray Observatory OTA – (instrumentation) Optical Telescope Assembly, the optics of the Hubble Space Telescope OVV – (celestial object) an optically violent variable quasar.
 OWL – (telescope) orbiting wide-angle light-collectors, two satellites that will work together to observe cosmic rays hitting the Earth's atmosphere OWL – (telescope) OverWhelmingly Large Telescope, a proposed telescope with a primary mirror with a width of 100 m P 
 P60 – (telescope) Palomar 60-inch telescope
 PA – (astrophysics terminology) Position Angle
 PACS - (instrumentation) Photodetecting Array Camera and Spectrometer, a Herschel imaging camera and low resolution spectrometer PAH – (astrophysics terminology) polycyclic aromatic hydrocarbon
 PAMELA – (telescope) Payload for Antimatter Matter Exploration and Light-nuclei Astrophysics, a space telescope used to study cosmic rays Pan-STARRS – (telescope) Panoramic Survey Telescope And Rapid Response System
 PASJ – (publication) Publications of the Astronomical Society of Japan
 PASP – (publication) Publications of the Astronomical Society of the Pacific
 PCA – (instrumentation) Proportional Counter Array, an X-ray detector on the Rossi X-ray Timing Explorer PCAS – (observing program) Planet-Crossing Asteroid Survey
 PDBI – (telescope) Plateau de Bure Interferometer, a radio telescope PDR – a photodissociation region or photon-dominated region (both terms are used synonymously); a region in the neutral ISM in which far-ultraviolet photons dominate the heating and chemistry PDS – is a distributed data system that NASA uses to archive data collected by Solar System missions.
 PEP – (instrumentation) PhotoElectric Photometry, an observing technique using photometers PEPE – (instrumentation) Plasma Experiment for Planetary Exploration, an instrument on Deep Space 1PGC – Principal Galaxies Catalogue
 PHA – (celestial object) Potentially Hazardous Asteroid
 PI – (person) Principal Investigator, the person who leads a scientific project PK – (catalog) Perek-Kohoutek, a catalog of planetary nebulae PKS – (Telescope) Refers to Parkes Observatory, a radio telescope in Australia
 Planemo – (celestial object) planetary mass object
 PLANET – (observing program) Probing Lensing Anomalies NETwork, a program to search for microlensing events PLS – (observing program) Palomar-Leiden Survey, a program to search for asteroids PMPS – (observing program) Parkes Multibeam Pulsar Survey
 PMS – (celestial object) pre-main sequence, young stars that are still in the process of formation also pre-MS
 PMT – (instrumentation) photomultiplier tube
 P-L – a set of asteroid discoveries in the 1960s
 PN – (celestial object) planetary nebula
 also PNe (plural form of planetary nebula)
 PNG – (catalog) Galactic Planetary Nebula
 PNLF – (astrophysics terminology) Planetary Nebula Luminosity Function, the density of planetary nebula as a function of their luminosity PNN – (celestial object) planetary nebula nucleus, the central star in a planetary nebula PNNV – (celestial object) planetary nebula nucleus variable, a variable star in the center of a planetary nebula POSS – (observing program) Palomar Observatory Sky Survey
POSSUM – Polarisation Sky Survey of the Universe's Magnetism
 PPARC – (organization) Particle Physics and Astronomy Research Council, a major government-sponsored science agency in the United Kingdom, merged into the Science and Technology Facilities Council in 2007 PPM – (catalog) Positions and Proper Motions, a catalog of the positions and proper motions of stars PPN – (celestial object) proto-planetary nebula, an object that has partially evolved from a red giant to a planetary nebula PRE – (astrophysics terminology) photospheric radius expansion
 PRIMUS – Prism Multi-Object Survey, a large [spectroscopsurvey]
 Proplyd – (celestial object) protoplanetary disk
 PSC – (catalog) Point Source Catalog, a catalog of point-like infrared sources detected with the Infrared Astronomy Satellite PSF – (instrumentation) Point Spread Function, a function that describes the blurring of a point source that is caused by the optics of the telescope and instrument (as well as other effects) PSI – (organization) Planetary Science Institute
 PSR – (celestial object) Pulsar
 PVO – (spacecraft) Pioneer Venus Orbiter
 PVTEL – (celestial object) PV TELescopii, a class of pulsating variable stars named after PV Telescopii, the archetype for the class PWD – (celestial object) pre-white dwarf, a star that no longer creates energy through fusion that will eventually evolve into a white dwarf PWN – (celestial object) pulsar wind nebula
 PZT – (telescope) photographic zenith tube, a general name for any telescope designed to observe objects passing at the zenith Q 
 QBO – (astrophysics terminology) quasi-biennial oscillation, a type of season variation in the Earth's atmosphere QGP - Quark-Gluon Plasma
 QE – (instrumentation) quantum efficiency, the sensitivity of CCDs QPO – (astrophysics terminology) quasi-periodic oscillation
 QSO – (celestial object) quasi-stellar object
 Quasar – (celestial object) quasi-stellar radio source

 R 
 RAPTOR – Rapid Telescopes for Optical Response project
 RA – (astrophysics terminology) Right ascension
 RAFGL – See AFGL.
 RAMBO – (celestial object) An association of brown dwarfs or white dwarfs form a dark cluster.
 RAS – (organization) Royal Astronomical Society
 RASC – (organization) Royal Astronomical Society of Canada
 RASS – (observing program/catalog) ROSAT All-Sky Survey, used as both a name for a survey with ROSAT and the catalogs produced from the survey RC – (celestial object) Red Clump, a type of metal-rich red giant star also RCG – red clump giant
 RC – (catalog) Reference Catalogue, a catalog of nearby galaxies RC2 – Reference Catalogue, 2nd edition
 RC3 – Reference Catalogue, 3rd edition
 RC – (organization/telescope) Ritchey Chretien, a manufacturer of amateur and professional telescope equipment; also the telescopes themselves RCB – (celestial object) R Coronae Borealis, a class of eruptive variable stars named after R Coronae Borealis, the archetype for the class RDI – (astrophysics terminology) radiation-driven implosion
 RECONS – (organization) Research Consortium on Nearby Stars, a survey of nearby stars RGB – (celestial object) red-giant branch, a star that is evolving from a main-sequence star into a red giant Can also refer to the ROSAT-Green Bank Catalog
 RGO – (organization) Royal Greenwich Observatory
 RLOF – (astrophysics terminology) Roche Lobe Overflow, the result of when an object in a binary system is larger than its roche lobe (i.e. when an object in a binary system expands to a radius where tidal forces become stronger than gravitational forces) RLQ – (celestial object) radio loud quasar, a quasar that produces strong radio emission RNGC – (catalog) Revised New General Catalog
 RORF – (astrophysics terminology) radio/optical reference frame, an inertial reference frame based on extragalactic radio sources ROSAT – (telescope) ROentgen SATellite, an X-ray space telescope ROTSE – (observing program/telescope) Robotic Optical Transient Search Experiment, an observing program for detecting the optical counterparts of gamma ray bursts; also the telescopes used in this program RQQ – (celestial object) radio-quiet quasar a quasar that produces weak radio emission RRAT – (celestial object) rotating radio transient, a population of rotating neutron stars that produce periodic bursts of emission that are separated by intervals of minutes or hours RRL – (celestial object) RR Lyrae, a class of pulsating variable stars named after RR Lyrae, the archetype of the class also RR
 RSA – (catalog) Revised Shapley-Ames, a catalog of nearby galaxies RSA – (organization) Russian Space Agency
 RSAA – (organization) Research School of Astronomy and Astrophysics, part of the Institute of Advanced Studies at the Australian National University RSG – (celestial object) red super giant
 RSN – (celestial object) radio supernova
 RTG – (instrumentation) Radioisotope Thermoelectric Generator, a type of power generator used in spacecraft that travel far from the Sun RV – (astrophysics terminology) radial velocity, the velocity along the line of sight RX – (catalog) ROSAT X-ray, a catalog of sources detected by ROSAT RXTE – (telescope) Rossi X-Ray Timing Explorer, a space telescope designed to observe variability in X-ray emission S 
 S82 – Stripe 82
 S&T – (publication) Sky & Telescope
 SAAO – (organization) South African Astronomical Observatory
 SALT – (telescope) Southern African Large Telescope
 SAF – (organization) Société astronomique de France (French Astronomical Society)
 SAM – (astrophysics terminology) Semi-Analytic Modeling, models that draw on numerical and analytical methods to model dark matter evolution in galaxies SAO – (organization/catalog) Smithsonian Astrophysical Observatory, the name of astrophysics research organization associated with Harvard University; also a catalog of stars SARA – (organization) Society of Amateur Radio Astronomers
 SAS – (software) Science Analysis Software, a software package used for processing data from the XMM-Newton Observatory SAT – (telescope) synthetic aperture telescope
 SAVAL – (organization) Sociedad Astronómica de Valparaíso y Viña del Mar, Chile. Amateur Astronomy. Founded in 1956.
 SB – (celestial object) spectroscopic binary
 SB1 – spectroscopic binary, single-lined spectra
 SB2 – spectroscopic binary, double-lined spectra
 SB – (astrophysics terminology) surface brightness
 SBIG – (organization/instrumentation) Santa Barbara Instrument Group, the name of both a company that manufactures telescope equipment and the company's products SBNC – (organization) Small Bodies Names Committee, an older name for the Committee for Small Body Nomenclature SCP – (observing program) Supernova Cosmology Project, a project to measure the expansion of the universe using supernovae at high redshifts SCR – (observing program) SuperCOSMOS-RECONS, a survey that measured the proper motions of stars SCT – (telescope) Schmidt–Cassegrain telescope, a general name for a type of compact telescope that uses both lenses and mirrors SCUBA – (instrumentation) Submillimetre Common User Bolometer Array, a submillimeter imager formerly at the James Clerk Maxwell TelescopeSCUBA-2 – (instrumentation) Submillimetre Common User Bolometer Array 2, a submillimeter imager that will replace SCUBA sd – (celestial object) subdwarf, stars fainter than main-sequence stars with the same colors; often used as a prefix to a star's spectral type SDO – (celestial object) scattered disk object, Kuiper belt objects with highly eccentric, highly inclined orbits also SKBO – Scattered Kuiper belt object
 SDOR – (celestial object) S DORadus, a class of eruptive variable stars named after S Doradus, the archetype for the class SDSS – (observing program/catalog) Sloan Digital Sky Survey, a large imaging and spectroscopic survey; also the catalog of sources from the survey SDSSp – (catalog) Sloan Digital Sky Survey provisory / preliminary
 SEAAN – (organization) Southeast Asia Astronomy Network, astronomy research and education among Southeast Asian countries SED – (astrophyics terminology) Spectral Energy Distribution
 SEDS – (organization) Students for the Exploration and Development of Space
 SERC – (organization) Science and Engineering Research Council
 SEST – (telescope) Swedish–ESO Submillimetre Telescope
 SETI – (observing program) Search for Extra-Terrestrial Intelligence
 SF – (astrophysics terminology) star formation
 SFH – (astrophysics terminology) star formation history
 SFR – (astrophyics terminology) star formation rate
 SGF – (organization) – SpaceGuard Foundation, an organization that tracks near-Earth asteroids SGR – (celestial object) – soft gamma repeater, a type of neutron star with strong magnetic fields that produces very large bursts of energy SGRB – (celestial object) – Short Gamma-Ray Burst.
 SHOES-Supernovae, HO, for the Equation of State of Dark energy
 SID – (astrophysics terminology) Sudden Ionospheric Disturbance, a disturbance in the Earth's ionosphere caused by the Sun SIDC – (organization) Sunspot Index Data Center
 SIM – (telescope) Space Interferometry Mission, a planned optical space telescope that will be used to measure distances to stars SIMBAD – (software) Set of Identifications, Measurements, and Bibliography for Astronomical Data, a website that provides catalog data on astronomical objects SINGG – (observing program) Survey of Ionization in Neutral Gas Galaxies, a survey of star formation in nearby galaxies selected by gas rich galaxies using H-alpha and ultraviolet observations SINGS – (observing program) Spitzer Infrared Nearby Galaxies Survey
 SIPS – (observing program/catalog) Southern Infrared Proper Motion Survey, a program to identify stars with high proper motions at infrared wavelengths SIRTF – (telescope) Space InfraRed Telescope Facility or Shuttle InfraRed Telescope Facility, older names for the Spitzer Space Telescope SIS – (Instrumentation) Superconductor-Isolator-Superconductor
 SKA – (telescope) Square Kilometre Array
 SL – (catalog) Shoemaker–Levy, the comets discovered by Shoemaker and Levy, particularly Shoemaker–Levy 9 SL – (spacecraft) SpaceLab
 SLED - (astrophysics terminology) Spectral Line Energy Distribution, a description of the relative strength of CO emission lines 
 SLS – (launch vehicle) American Space Shuttle-derived super heavy-lift expendable launch vehicle.
 SMA – (telescope) Submillimeter Array
 SMART – (spacecraft) Small Missions for Advanced Research in Technology
 SMARTS – (organization) Small and Moderate Aperture Research Telescope System at Cerro Tololo Inter-American Observatory
 SMBH – (celestial object) super massive black hole
 SMC – (celestial object) Small Magellanic Cloud
 SME – (spacecraft) Solar Mesosphere Explorer, a spacecraft used to study the Earth's ozone layer SMEX – (spacecraft) SMall EXplorers, the name of a series of small astronomical spacecraft; also the program to develop the spacecraft SMG - (celestial object) submillimeter galaxy
 SMM – (telescope) Solar Maximum Mission, a solar space telescope SN – (instrumentation) signal-to-noise, the ratio of the signal from an object to the noise from the detector that measured the signal also SNR – Signal-to-nosie ratio
 SN – (celestial object) supernova
 also SNe (plural form of SN)
 SNAP – (telescope) SuperNova Acceleration Probe, proposed space telescope SNR – (celestial object) supernova remnant
 SNU – (astrophysics terminology) solar neutrino units
 SOARD – (software) Steward Observatory Asteroid Relational Database
 SOFIA – (telescope) Stratospheric Observatory for Infrared Astronomy, an infrared telescope currently under construction that will fly inside a modified Boeing 747 aircraft SOHO – (telescope) SOlar and Heliospheric Observatory, a solar space telescope SONEAR – Southern Observatory for Near Earth Asteroids Research
SOLO – Solar Orbiter
 SPARTAN – (telescope) Shuttle Pointed Autonomous Research Tool for AstroNomy, an ultraviolet space telescope that can be released and retrieved by the Space Shuttle SPHERE – (instrumentation) Spectro-Polarimetric High-Contrast Exoplanet Research, VLT
 SPIRE - (instrumentation) Spectral and Photometric Imaging Receiver, a Herschel imaging camera and low-resolution spectrometer SPIRIT – (instrument) SPace InfraRed Imaging Telescope, an infrared instrument on the Midcourse Space Experiment spacecraft SPS – (spacecraft) solar power satellite, a general name for proposed satellites that would convert solar power into energy and then beam the energy to the surface of a planet (such as Earth) in the form of microwaves SPS – (astrophysical terminology) stellar population synthesis
 SPT – (telescope) South Pole Telescope
 SQIID – (instrumentation) Simultaneous Quad Infrared Imaging Device
 SQM – (celestial object) strange quark matter
 SR – (astrophysics terminology) Special Relativity
 SRON – (organization) Space Research Organization of the Netherlands
 SS – (celestial object) Symbiotic Star, a type of binary star system containing a red giant and a hot dwarf star that generate a cone-shaped nebula SSI – (instrumentation) Solid-State Imager, an instrument on the Galileo spacecraft SSI – (organization) Space Studies Institute
 SSP – (instrumentation) Surface Science Package, on board the Huygens probe SSP – (astrophysics terminology) simple stellar population
 SSRQ – (celestial object) Steep Spectrum Radio Quasars
 SSS – (observing program) SuperCOSMOS Sky Surveys
 SSSPM – (catalog) SuperCOSMOS Sky Survey Proper Motion
 SST – (telescope) Spectroscopic Survey Telescope
 SST – (telescope) Spitzer Space Telescope, a space telescope STARSMOG – (observing program) STarlight Absorption Reduction through a Survey of Multiple Occulting Galaxies, a survey using Hubble Space Telescope imaging
 STEPS – (observing program) STEllar Planet Survey
 STEREO – Solar TErrestrial RElations Observatory
 STIS – (instrumentation) Space Telescope Imaging Spectrograph, an instrument on the Hubble Space Telescope STS – (vehicle) Shuttle Transport System or Space Transportation System
 STScI – (organization) Space Telescope Science Institute
 STSDAS – (software)	Space Telescope Science Data Analysis System
 SUGRA – (astrophysics terminology) supergravity
 SUPRIME – (instrumentation) SUbaru PRIME focus CAMera, an instrument on the Subaru Telescope SUSI – (telescope) Sydney University Stellar Interferometer,  an optical interferometer SWAN – (instrumentation) Solar Wind ANisotropy, an instrument on SOHO SWAS – (telescope) Submillimeter Wave Astronomy Satellite, a submillimeter space telescope SWEEPS – (observing program) – Sagittarius Window Eclipsing Extrasolar Planet Search, a survey of a subsection of the plane of the Milky Way performed with the Hubble Space Telescope SWIRE – (observing program) Spitzer Wide-area InfraRed Extragalactic survey
 SwRI – (organization) Southwest Research Institute
 SXARI – (celestial object) SX ARIetis, a class of rotating variable stars named after SX Arietis, the archetype for the class SXPHE – (celestial object) SX PhoEnicis, a class of pulsating variable stars named after SX Phoenicis, the archetype for the class T 
 T-1 – (observing program) First Jupiter Trojan survey at Mount Palomar, part of the P–L survey
 T-2 – (observing program) Second Jupiter Trojan survey at Mount Palomar, part of the P–L survey
 T-3 – (observing program) Third Jupiter Trojan survey at Mount Palomar, part of the P–L survey
 TABLEAUX – International Conference on Automated Reasoning with Analytic Tableaux and Related Methods
 TAC – (organization) Time Allocation Committee or Telescope Allocation Committee, a general name for a committee that awards telescope observing time TAC – (catalog) Twin Astrograph Catalog
 TAI – (astrophysics terminology) International Atomic Time
 TAMS – (astrophysics terminology) terminal-age main sequence, stars at the point in their lifetimes where they have finished burning hydrogen in their cores TAROT – (telescope) Télescope à Action Rapide pour les Objets Transitoires
 TASS – (observing program) The Amateur Sky Survey
 TAU – (spacecraft) Thousand Astronomical Unit, a spacecraft mission proposed in the 1980s that would reach 1000 AU in 50 years TCB – (astrophysics terminology) Barycentric Coordinate Time
 TCC – Theory of Cryptography Conference
 TCG – (astrophysics terminology) Geocentric Coordinate Time
 TDB – (astrophysics terminology) Barycentric Dynamical Time
 TDRSS – (communications network) Tracking and Data Relay Satellite System, an array of satellites used by NASA to communicate with many spacecraft in low Earth orbit TES – (instrumentation) Thermal Emission Spectrometer, a spectrometer on the Mars Observer TESS - (spacecraft) Transiting Exoplanet Survey Satellite, NASA: an all-sky survey mission that will discover thousands of exoplanets around nearby bright stars. TESS launched 18 April 2018 aboard a SpaceX Falcon 9 rocket TEP – (organization) Transits of Extrasolar Planets
 TGF – (celestial object) – Terrestrial gamma-ray flash, gamma rays emitted from Earth's lightning storms
 THEMIS – (instrumentation) Thermal Emission Imaging System, a camera on the Mars Odyssey spacecraft TIC – (catalog) Tycho Input Catalog, a predecessor of the Hipparcos Input Catalog TIFR – (organization) – Tata Institute of Fundamental Research - India
 TIR – (astrophysics terminology) total infrared
 TIMED – (spacecraft) thermosphere ionosphere mesosphere energetics and dynamics
 TIE – (organization) Telescopes In Education
 TLP – (astrophysics terminology) Transient Lunar Phenomenon, an unexplained flash of light observed from the Moon TMC – (celestial object) Taurus Molecular Cloud
 TMT – (telescope) – Thirty Meter Telescope, formerly known as California Extremely Large Telescope TN – (person) telescope nut, nickname for an amateur telescope maker
 TNO – (celestial object) trans-Neptunian object, any object that orbits the Sun at a distance greater than that of Neptune TO – (person) telescope operator, the technician who assists in operating a telescope during astronomical observations TOPS – (meeting) Toward Other Planetary Systems, a series of educational astronomy workshops TPF – (telescope) Terrestrial Planet Finder, a planned space telescope that will be used to find extrasolar Earth-like planetsTPHOLs – Theorem Proving in Higher-Order Logics
 TRACE – Transition Region and Coronal Explorer, a solar space telescope TrES – (telescope) Transatlantic Exoplanet Survey
 TT – (astrophysics terminology) Terrestrial Time
 also TDT – terrestrial dynamical time
 TTS – (celestial object) T-Tauri star
 TWA – (celestial object) TW Hydrae Association
 TYC – (catalog) Tycho, a catalog that was the predecessor of the Hipparcos (HIP) Catalogue TZO – (celestial object) Thorne–Żytkow object, the object that forms when a neutron star merges with a red giant U 

UAI – Union Astronomique Internationale
 UARS – (spacecraft) Upper Atmosphere Research Satellite, a satellite used to study the Earth's upper atmosphere UCAC – (catalog) USNO CCD Astrometric Catalog
 UESAC – (observing program) Uppsala-ESO Survey of Asteroids and Comets
 UFO – (astrophysics terminology) unidentified flying object
 UG – (celestial object) U Geminorum, a class of cataclysmic variable stars (also known as dwarf novae) that are named after U Geminorum, the archetype for the class UGSS – (celestial object) UG SS Cygni, a subclass of UG-type stars named after SS Cygni, the archetype for the subclass UGSU – (celestial object) UG SU Ursae Majoris, a subclass of UG-type stars named after SU Ursae Majoris, the archetype for the subclass UGWZ – (celestial object) UG WZ Sagittae, a subclass of UG-type stars named after WZ Sagittae, the archetype for the subclass UGZ – (celestial object) UG Z Camelopardalis, a subclass of UG-type stars named after Z Camelopardalis, the archetype for the subclass UGC – (catalog) Uppsala General Catalogue, a catalog of galaxies UIT – (telescope) Ultraviolet Imaging Telescope, an ultraviolet telescope that was operated from the cargo bay of the Space Shuttle UKIDSS – (observing program/catalog) UKIRT Infrared Deep Sky Survey
 UKIRT – (telescope) United Kingdom Infrared Telescope
 UKSA – (organization) UK Space Agency
 UKST – (telescope) United Kingdom Schmidt Telescope
 ULIRG – (celestial object) UltraLuminous InfraRed Galaxy, a galaxy that is brighter than 1012 solar luminosities in the infrared ULX – (celestial object) ultraluminous x-ray source
 UMS – (celestial object) Upper Main Sequence, the more massive hydrogen-burning main-sequence stars USAF – (organization) United States Air Force
 USGS – (organization) United States Geological Survey
 USNO – (organization) United States Naval Observatory
 UT – (astrophysics terminology) Universal Time
 UTC – (astrophysics terminology) Coordinated Universal Time
 UV – (astrophysics terminology) ultraviolet
 UVS – (instrumentation) UltraViolet Spectrometer, the name of instruments on the Voyager and Galileo spacecraft UXOR – (celestial object) UX ORionis objects, a class of variable pre–main sequence stars named after UX Orionis, the archetype for the class
UZC – Updated Zwicky Catalogue

 V 
 VBO – (organization) Vainu Bappu Observatory, located in India VBT – (telescope) Vainu Bappu Telescope, located at Vainu Bappu Observatory VCC – (catalog) Virgo Cluster Catalog, a catalog of galaxies in the Virgo Cluster VdS – (organization) Vereinigung der Sternfreunde, the German amateur astronomers society VEEGA – (astrophysics terminology) Venus-Earth-Earth Gravity Assist, the path taken by the Galileo spacecraft to reach Jupiter VeLLO – (celestial object) very-low-luminosity object
 VERITAS – (telescope) Very Energetic Radiation Imaging Telescope Array System, gamma-ray telescope in Arizona sensitive to GeV/TeV gamma rays VERA – (telescope) VLBI Exploration of Radio Astrometry, a Japanese radio telescope designed for studying objects in the Milky Way VHE – (astrophysics terminology) Very High Energy, gamma rays with high energies VIMOS – (instrumentation) VIsible Multi-Object Spectrograph, instrument on the VLTVIPERS – VIMOS Public Extragalactic Redshift Survey an ESO Large Program
 VISTA – (telescope) Visible and Infrared Survey Telescope for Astronomy
 VLA – (telescope) Very Large Array, a radio telescope in New Mexico operated by the National Radio Astronomy Observatory VLBA – (telescope) Very Long Baseline Array, a radio telescope operated by the National Radio Astronomy Observatory with antennas spread across the United States VLBI – (instrumentation) very long baseline interferometry, combining signals from multiple telescopes/radio antennas that are separated by large distances VLM – (astrophysics terminology) very low mass, objects (usually stars) that have relatively low masses VLT – (telescope) Very Large Telescope, four 8.2 meter telescopes in Chile that operate either independently as individual telescopes or together as an interferometer VLT-SPHERE – (instrumentation) Spectro-Polarimetric High-Contrast Exoplanet Research; istalled at VLT's UT3
 VMO – (software) The Virtual Meteor Observatory is an activity of the International Meteor Organization together with the Research and Scientific Support Department of the European Space Agency to store meteor data from observers all over the world.
 VO – (software) Virtual Observatory
 VOIR – (spacecraft) Venus Orbiting Imaging Radar, a spacecraft for mapping Venus that was canceled and then superseded by the Magellan spacecraft VRM – (spacecraft) Venus Radar Mapper, an older name for the Magellan spacecraft VSOLJ – (organization) Variable Star Observers League in Japan
 VSOP – (organization) VLBI Space Observatory Program, a project to use both satellites and ground-based radio telescopes as an interferometer VST – (telescope) VLT Survey Telescope
VV – Vorontsov-Vel'yaminov Interacting Galaxies
 VVDS – (observing program) VIMOS-VLT Deep Survey

 W 
WALLABY – a survey of neutral hydrogen in galaxies
 WD – (celestial object) white dwarf
 WDM – (astrophysics terminology) warm dark matter, any model for structure formation in the universe that characterizes "hot" particles such as neutrinos as dark matter WDS – (catalog) Washington Double Star, a catalog of double stars WEBT – (organization) Whole Earth Blazar Telescope, a network of observers across the Earth who work together to perform continuous observations of blazars WET – (organization) Whole Earth Telescope, a network of astronomers spread across the Earth who work together to perform continuous observations of variable stars WFCAM – (instrumentation) Wide Field Camera, a camera on the United Kingdom Infrared Telescope WFIRST - (telescope) Wide-Field Infrared Survey Telescope, former name of the Nancy Grace Roman Space Telescope scheduled for launch in 2025 WFMOS – (instrumentation) Wide-Field Multi-Object Spectrograph, proposed instrument for the Gemini telescopes WFPC – (instrumentation) Wide Field and Planetary Camera, a camera formerly on the Hubble Space Telescope that was replaced with WFPC2 WFPC2 – (instrumentation) Wide Field and Planetary Camera 2, a camera on the Hubble Space Telescope WFC – (instrumentation) Wide-Field Channel, one of the detectors in the Advanced Camera for Surveys on the Hubble Space Telescope WGPSN – (organization) Working Group for Planetary System Nomenclature
 WHT – (telescope) William Herschel Telescope
 WIMP – (celestial object) Weakly Interacting Massive Particle, a hypothetical subatomic particle that may comprise most of the dark matter in the universe WIRCam – (instrumentation) Wide-field InfraRed Camera, instrument on the Canada-France-Hawaii TelescopeWIRE – Wide Field Infrared Explorer
 WISARD – (software) Web Interface for Searching Archival Research Data
 WISE – (observing program) Wide-field Infrared Survey Explorer
 WIYN – (telescope) Wisconsin-Indiana-Yale-NOAO, the name of a telescope at Kitt Peak operated by the University of Wisconsin–Madison, Indiana University, Yale University, and the National Optical Astronomy Observatory WLM – (celestial object) Wolf-Lundmark-Melotte, a nearby dwarf galaxy in the constellation Cetus WMAP – (telescope) Wilkinson Microwave Anisotrophy Probe, a space telescope used to study the cosmic microwave background radiation WR – (celestial object) Wolf–Rayet, a type of hot, luminous star with strong stellar winds WC – (celestial object) carbon-rich Wolf–Rayet, a Wolf–Rayet star with strong carbon spectral line emission WN – (celestial object) nitrogen-rich Wolf–Rayet, a Wolf–Rayet star with strong nitrogen spectral line emission WNE – (celestial object) early-type nitrogen-rich wolf–rayet, a wn star without hydrogen spectral line emission WNL – (celestial object) late-type nitrogen-rich Wolf–Rayet, a WN star with hydrogen spectral line emission WO – (celestial object) oxygen-rich Wolf–Rayet, a Wolf–Rayet star with strong oxygen spectral line emission WSRT – (telescope) an aperture synthesis interferometer that consists of a linear array of 14 antennas
 WTTS – (celestial object) weak-line t-tauri star, a type of young star with weak spectral line emission X 
 XCS – (observing program) XMM Cluster Survey
 XIS – (instrumentation) X-ray imaging spectrometer, an instrument on the Suzaku space telescope XMM – (telescope) X-ray Multi-Mirror, the XMM-Newton earth-orbiting X-ray-sensitive telescope XN – (celestial object) x-ray nova
 XRF – (celestial object) x-ray flash

 Y 
 Ys – (celestial object) yellow straggler
 YSG – (celestial object) yellow super giant star
 YSO – (celestial object) young stellar object

 Z 
 ZAHB – (celestial object) "zero-age" horizontal branch, horizontal branch stars that have just begun burning helium in their cores and hydrogen in a shell around the cores ZAMS – (celestial object) zero age main sequence, a star that has just become a main-sequence star (i.e. a star that has begun burning hydrogen in its core) ZAND – (celestial object) Z ANDromedae, a class of eruptive variable stars named after the binary star system Z Andromedae, the archetype for the class ZANDE – (celestial object) Z ANDromedae with eclipses, a subclass of ZAND stars where the stars eclipse each other ZEPLIN – (instrumentation) ZonEd proportional scintillation in liquid noble gases, a dark matter detector ZHR – (astrophysics terminology) zenith hourly rate, the maximum number of meteors per hour that may be observed during a meteor shower Z-FOURGE – (survey'') The FourStar Galaxy Evolution Survey
ZOA – Zone of Avoidance

See also 
 List of common astronomy symbols
 List of astronomical catalogues
 Glossary of astronomy
 Modern constellations

References 

 AAVSO Type List. Information retrieved on 2006-09-10 – 2006-09-11
 Abbreviations and acronyms frequently used in astronomy. Information retrieved on 2006-08-28 – 2006-09-12
 The Encyclopedia of Astrobiology, Astronomy, and Spaceflight. Information retrieved on 2006-08-27 – 2006-09-12
 Frequently Seen Space/Astronomy Acronyms. Information retrieved on 2006-08-27 – 2006-09-12

External links 
 The Canonical Astronomy Abbreviations/Acronyms List
 Astronomy Acronyms and Astronomy Abbreviations

Acronyms
Astronomy